In Greek mythology, Achaeus or Achaios (Ancient Greek: Ἀχαιός Akhaiós means 'griever', derived from αχος achos, 'grief, pain, woe')  was the name of two mythological characters:

Achaeus, son of Poseidon and the eponym of Achaea.
Achaeus, son of Xuthus and mythical founder of Achaean race.
Achaeus, son of Phthia, daughter of Phoroneus and the god Zeus.

Notes

References 

Dionysus of Halicarnassus, Roman Antiquities. English translation by Earnest Cary in the Loeb Classical Library, 7 volumes. Harvard University Press, 1937-1950. Online version at Bill Thayer's Web Site
Dionysius of Halicarnassus, Antiquitatum Romanarum quae supersunt, Vol I-IV. . Karl Jacoby. In Aedibus B.G. Teubneri. Leipzig. 1885. Greek text available at the Perseus Digital Library.
Graves, Robert, The Greek Myths, Harmondsworth, London, England, Penguin Books, 1960. 
Graves, Robert, The Greek Myths: The Complete and Definitive Edition. Penguin Books Limited. 2017. 
Hesiod, Theogony from The Homeric Hymns and Homerica with an English Translation by Hugh G. Evelyn-White, Cambridge, MA.,Harvard University Press; London, William Heinemann Ltd. 1914. Online version at the Perseus Digital Library. Greek text available from the same website.
Pseudo-Clement, Recognitions from Ante-Nicene Library Volume 8, translated by Smith, Rev. Thomas. T. & T. Clark, Edinburgh. 1867. Online version at theio.com.

Children of Poseidon
Children of Zeus
Mythology of Argolis